Haplochromis xenognathus is a species of cichlid endemic to Lake Victoria.  This species reaches a length of  SL.

References

xenognathus
Fish described in 1957
Taxonomy articles created by Polbot